South Africa participated at the 2011 Commonwealth Youth Games in Isle of Man from 7 to 13 September 2011. The South African athletes competed in all the seven sports of the program.

References

Nations at the 2011 Commonwealth Youth Games
2011 in South African sport